Timothy Arnold Spencer (born December 10, 1960) is a former professional American football running back who played in the USFL and NFL from 1983 to 1990.

Playing career
Spencer was drafted by the Chicago Blitz of the United States Football League in 1983 after a college football career at Ohio State where he ran for 1371 yards in his senior season. He closed out his career with 3,553 yards rushing and ranks fifth on OSU's all-time rushing list, trailing only Archie Griffin (5,589), J. K. Dobbins (4,459), Ezekiel Elliott (3,961), and Eddie George (3,768). Spencer shared the backfield with Kevin Long as the starting running back with Chicago and rushed for 1157 yards on 300 carries with six touchdowns in his rookie season.

In 1984, Spencer played for the Arizona Wranglers and rushed for 1212 yards on 227 carries for a 5.3 yards per carry average. He also ran for 17 touchdowns. The following season, he played for the Memphis Showboats and rushed for 789 yards on 198 carries with three touchdowns. Spencer finished as the 3rd leading rusher in USFL history.

In 1985, Spencer signed to play for the San Diego Chargers, the same NFL team that drafted him in the 11th round of the 1983 NFL Draft. He rushed for 478 yards on 124 carries with 10 touchdowns that season. His biggest NFL season was in 1989, when he rushed for 521 yards on 134 carries. He was a limited reserve for the rest of his career with the Chargers and retired after the 1990 season.

Coaching career
In 1994, Spencer returned to Ohio State to be their running backs coach, a position he held until 2003. On January 27, 2004, he was announced as the running backs coach for the Chicago Bears. Spencer was not retained by the Bears in 2013 following the hiring of Marc Trestman.

He joined Lovie Smith's staff at Tampa Bay for the 2014 season. In 2019 Spencer was not retained by coach Bruce Arians. He then joined the coaching staff at Lake Forest College in Lake Forest, Illinois as wide receivers coach.

References

1960 births
Living people
American football running backs
Arizona Wranglers players
Chicago Bears coaches
Chicago Blitz players
Memphis Showboats players
Ohio State Buckeyes football coaches
Ohio State Buckeyes football players
People from Martins Ferry, Ohio
San Diego Chargers players
Tampa Bay Buccaneers coaches